The Illinois River Bridge at Phillips Ford is a historic bridge in rural northern Washington County, Arkansas. It is a double-span closed-spandrel concrete arch bridge built in 1928 by the Luten Bridge Company, and it carries County Road 848 across the Illinois River in the Ozark National Forest south of U.S. Route 412 (US 412). The bridge uses Luten's patented method of reducing material in the bridge by the addition of metal rings to the spandrel walls.

The bridge was listed on the National Register of Historic Places in 2009.

See also
National Register of Historic Places listings in Washington County, Arkansas
List of bridges on the National Register of Historic Places in Arkansas

References

Road bridges on the National Register of Historic Places in Arkansas
Bridges completed in 1928
National Register of Historic Places in Washington County, Arkansas
Arch bridges in the United States
Concrete bridges in the United States
1928 establishments in Arkansas
Ozark–St. Francis National Forest
Luten bridges
Transportation in Washington County, Arkansas
Illinois River (Oklahoma)